North Dakota Highway 1 (ND 1) is a major north–south highway in North Dakota. It runs from Manitoba Highway 31 in Maida to South Dakota Highway 37 south of Ludden.

Route description
ND 1 enters North Dakota as a continuation on South Dakota Highway 37 five miles south of ND 11. After a concurrency with this road that heads east for three miles, then north for seven miles, ND 1 continues north for two miles before entering the city of Oakes. Six miles north of Oakes, the route begins a concurrency of about 10½ miles with ND 13. This concurrency travels almost due north and ends in Verona. Six miles north of Verona, ND 1 intersects with the western terminus of ND 27. Thirteen miles farther north, the highway intersects ND 46. A little more than nineteen miles north of this intersection, west of Valley City, ND 1 begins a concurrency with Interstate 94 and US 52. The three highways travel west for about six miles before I-94 and US 52 continue west and ND 1 turns north.

Eleven miles north of the concurrency, ND 1 enters the western portion of Rogers. A mile north of Rogers, the route serves as the eastern terminus of ND 9. About six miles north of here, ND 1 enters Dazey and intersects ND 26. Eight miles north of the ND 26 intersection, ND 1 enters Hannaford. About ten miles north of Hannaford and two miles west of Cooperstown (which ND 1 never enters), the highways begins a concurrency with North Dakota's longest state highway, ND 200. Six miles farther west, ND 200 and ND 1 part. ND 1 heads north for four miles, west for a mile, and north for three miles before intersecting ND 65 just east of Binford. About sixteen miles north of here, ND 1 intersects ND 15 outside Pekin. About twenty miles north of here is an intersection with US 2 and the city of Lakota.

North of Lakota, ND 1 travels just northeast of Brocket. Six miles north of Brocket is the community of Lawton. About eight miles north of Lawton, ND 1 intersects ND 17. Twelve miles north of that intersection, the highway enters Nekoma. Just less than five miles north of Nekoma, ND 1 intersects ND 66. Nine miles farther north, ND 1 enters Langdon. In Langdon, ND 1 intersects ND 5. The remaining sixteen miles of this highway in North Dakota and the United States feature intersections with a couple of county roads before the Canadian border. ND 1 is continued into Manitoba, Canada, as Manitoba Highway 31.

History
North Dakota Highway 1 was assigned by 1926 as a highway from the Canada border north of Pembina to the South Dakota border. This highway became part of US 81 in 1927, and Highway 1 was reassigned as a renumbering of North Dakota Highway 12 from Langdon to South Dakota to avoid conflict with US 12. The highway was extended north to Canada by 1937. It remains in this alignment today.

Major intersections

References

External links
The North Dakota Highways Page by Chris Geelhart

001
Transportation in Dickey County, North Dakota
Transportation in LaMoure County, North Dakota
Transportation in Barnes County, North Dakota
Transportation in Griggs County, North Dakota
Transportation in Nelson County, North Dakota
Transportation in Walsh County, North Dakota
Transportation in Cavalier County, North Dakota